Françoise Balibar (born Françoise Dumesnil; 1941) is a French physicist and science historian, a professor emeritus at Paris Diderot University. She has extensively published works on Albert Einstein, the theory of relativity, and the history and epistemology of physics.

Biography 
Françoise Balibar studied at École Normale Supérieure from 1960 to 1964. She has written numerous articles in national and international journals and led the CNRS team in charge of six volumes of the French edition of Einstein's selected works. She is also the author of several books, including The Science of Crystals and Einstein: Decoding the Universe.

She is the wife of the philosopher Étienne Balibar and the mother of the actress Jeanne Balibar. She has appeared in two films:  in 1997 and Modern Life in 2000.

Selected publications 
 Co-author with Jean-Marc Lévy-Leblond, Quantics: Rudiments of Quantum Physics, North-Holland, 1990
 Co-author with Jean-Pierre Maury, How Things Fly, Barron's Educational Series, 1990
 The Science of Crystals, McGraw-Hill Companies, 1992
 Einstein : La joie de la pensée, collection « Découvertes Gallimard » (nº 193), série Sciences et techniques. Éditions Gallimard, 1993 (new edition in 2011)
 US edition – Einstein: Decoding the Universe, “Abrams Discoveries” series. Harry N. Abrams, 2001
 UK edition – Einstein: Decoding the Universe, ‘New Horizons’ series. Thames & Hudson, 2005
 Marie Curie : Femme savante ou Sainte Vierge de la science ?, collection « Découvertes Gallimard » (nº 497), série Sciences et techniques. Éditions Gallimard, 2006

References 

1941 births
Epistemologists
20th-century French physicists
French women physicists
Audiobook narrators
École Normale Supérieure alumni
Living people
21st-century French physicists
20th-century French women scientists
21st-century French women scientists
French women historians
20th-century French historians
20th-century French women writers